The Navajo Mine is a surface coal mine owned and operated by Navajo Transitional Energy Company (NTEC), LLC in New Mexico, USA, within the Navajo Nation. It operates  of track between the Four Corners Generating Station and Navajo Mine (formerly owned by BHP).

History
Navajo Mine's coal lease was granted in 1957. Then in 1963 Navajo Mine began operations for Utah International. The Navajo Mine is the sole supplier of coal to the adjacent Four Corners Power Plant (FCPP). In 1977 General Electric acquired Navajo Mine from Utah International. Seven years later in 1984 BHP acquired Navajo Mine, eventually merging with BHP Billiton.

In 2013 the 22nd Navajo Nation Council created Navajo Transitional Energy Company (NTEC), LLC under legislation No. 0116-13 with a vote of 7-4. By the end of that year NTEC acquired Navajo Mine. NTEC received a lease extension through the Department of the Interior and the Office of Surface Mining Reclamation & Enforcement (OSMRE) for 25-year site lease extension for Navajo Mine and Four Corners Power Plant.

In 2016 NTEC contracts North American Coal Corporation as the operator for Navajo Mine, forming Bisti Fuels Company, LLC. Two years later in 2018, NTEC acquires 7% ownership of Four Corners Power Plant, the 1,550 MW power plant. This makes NTEC the only tribal company in the United States to have partial ownership of a coal-fired power plant. Expanding further, NTEC acquires Cloud Peak Energy assets which included three coal mines in Wyoming and Montana. Those mines are Antelope, Cordero Rojo, and Spring Creek. This makes NTEC the third-largest coal producer in the United States.

Finally, on October 01, 2021 NTEC assumes full operations at Navajo Mine, thus becoming the first tribally owned coal mining company to operate a coal mine on tribal land. Navajo Mine employs approximately 370 people, with 86% being enrolled as Navajo members. Recently NTEC has been investing in solar power to expand to other energy alternatives. In addition to expanding into the Helium realm, acquiring Tacitus, LLC. The acquisition consists of helium wells and infrastructure in the Tocito Dome Field on the Navajo Nation as well as Federal and State leases for additional exploration in Utah. The Tocito Dome Field is proven and producing with existing offtake contracts in place. 

A -long standard gauge line was built in 1974 from the power plant to the Hosteen stockpile. The line was expanded to the present  in 1983. Since there is no connection to the national railroad network, the 3 diesel locomotives and 22 Maxon bottom dump coal hopper cars were transported from Gallup on low-bed trucks. At the beginning only one train operated. There were problems with clogged oil bath filters on the diesel locomotives due to excessive coal dust, but the issues were solved with a new filter type.

Electric operation started 1984 since it is more economical. Diesel operation became too expensive with increasing train loads and fuel prices. Another 20 hopper cars were purchased so that two trains could run, each having 18 cars.

Electric operations are being dismantled in favor of the new GE ET44AC diesel locomotives with more on the way.

When Kayenta Mine operations ceased and their railroad was decommissioned, the coal hopper cars were brought onto Navajo Mine.

Route
It has no connection to any other railroad.

Operation 

Trains are operated with an electric GE E60 locomotive on the north end and a diesel-electric ALCO Century 420 locomotive on the south end. The Century 425 is normally operated only as a control cab to for the radio remote-controlled E60, when the empty train is returning to the mine. The prime mover in the diesel-electric is still present to provide emergency power in event of an electric outage. There is sufficient equipment to create three trains, but only two trains are normally operated, each consisting of 21 coal hoppers. Each train typically makes 12 round trips during each 24 hour operating day. Only one crew member is at work at a time: this person takes an empty train to the coal load out, then changes to the loaded train to take it back to the power plant. While this train is underway, the other train is being loaded.

The railroad catenary has a voltage of 25 kV 60 Hz AC. The pantographs of the E60s are mounted atop pedestals on the roof to adapt to the unusually high catenary. Extra filters for cleaning the machine room air are mounted on the roof of the locomotive.

At the coal loadouts, front-end loaders deposit the coal into the hopper cars.

In addition to the mine served by the railroad, the Navajo Transitional Energy Company (NTEC) owns three other mines in Montana and Wyoming. In 2020, Arizona Public Service (APS) announced plans to close the Four Corners Generating Station. This closure would render both the mine and the railroad obsolete.

Motive Power
General Electric E60 with the road numbers LOE20, LOE21 and LOE23. These locomotives were built for Amtrak with the road numbers #961, #963 and #968 and were sold directly to the Navajo Mine Railroad, except #961, which was first sold to New Jersey Transit. All these locomotives were scrapped in 2003 and replaced by four E60s first delivered to Ferrocarriles Nacionales de México. These locomotives had previously served the Mexico City—Irapuato line, which was converted to an all-diesel operation.
ALCO Century 425 with the road numbers LOD7, LOD8 and LOD9. All locomotives are former Norfolk & Western (N&W) engines, which had the road numbers #1000, #1002 and #1005. The locomotives were originally ordered by the Wabash Railroad, before that company's merger with the N&W. They were rebuilt by Morrison-Knudsen for operation on the Navajo Mine Railroad.
Two General Electric ET44AC locomotives were delivered new in 2017 with road numbers 2026 and 2027.

See also 
 Mine railway
 Black Mesa and Lake Powell Railroad – other electric freight railroad on Navajo land, no longer in operation
 Deseret Power Railroad – other electric freight railroad

References

New Mexico railroads
Electric railways in New Mexico
Geography of the Navajo Nation
Railway companies established in 1974
25 kV AC railway electrification
Mining railways in the United States
Coal mining in the United States